Young Zulu Kid (born Giuseppe Di Melfi, April 22, 1897 – April 20, 1971) was a professional boxer.

He lost to Jimmy Wilde for the first ever world flyweight boxing championship.

Di Melfi also lost to Frankie Burns.

He also defeated Jackie Sharkey.

Di Melfi has a child named Joe Di Melfi who has recently been on The Michael Kay Show.

References

External links 
 
 CBZ Profile

1897 births
1971 deaths
Flyweight boxers
American people of Italian descent
Sportspeople from the Province of Potenza
Italian emigrants to the United States